Love Zone is the fourth and last studio album by Surface, released by Victor Entertainment Inc. on July 14, 1998 and distributed for the Japanese market only. It was the last album to feature the best-known lineup of the group; Jackson, Townsend and Conley.

The group announced a reunion tour for mid-2005 and the recording of a new album; however, David Townsend died on October 26, 2005 at age 50 before the new album was completed.

Track listing

Personnel
Surface
Bernard Jackson - lead & backing vocals, electric & acoustic guitars, bass, rapping
David Townsend - electric & acoustic guitars, synthesizers, electric piano, drum programming, backing vocals
David "Pic" Conley - saxophone, synthesized bass, drum programming, percussion, flute, orchestral hits, backing vocals
Duane "Squire" Smith - trumpet

References

[ Allmusic]
Discogs

External links
Love Zone at Discogs
Facebook Page
Soulwalking page
Bio at R&B Haven
Bio at AllThingsDeep

1998 albums
Surface (band) albums